William Lionel Burke (July 1941 – July 1996) was an astronomy, astrophysics, and physics professor at UC Santa Cruz. He is also the author of Spacetime, Geometry, Cosmology, and of Applied differential geometry, a text expounding the virtues of differential forms over vector calculus for theoretical physics.

Born in Bennington, Vermont, Burke obtained his Bachelor of Science degree from Caltech in 1963. His 1969 doctoral thesis, also at Caltech and supervised by Kip Thorne, Richard Feynman, and John Wheeler, was entitled The Coupling of Gravitational Radiation to Nonrelativistic Sources. His discovery of the Burke Potential, an aspect of gravitation overlooked by Einstein himself, dates from this period. He became a full professor at UCSC in 1988.

Burke is also known as the godfather of the Santa Cruz "Chaos Cabal" also known as the dynamical systems collective, that nurtured the seminal work of MacArthur Fellow Robert Shaw, Norman Packard, Doyne Farmer and James P. Crutchfield. In Tom Bass' book The Eudaemonic Pie, Burke prided himself for his Rubik's Cube costume at the end of the book which kept his identity concealed from his students.

An avid hiker, climber, skier, sailor, wind surfer, and Go player, Bill Burke died from complications due to a cervical fracture sustained in an automobile accident. Bill's understanding of science is paraphrased by his thinking: "Never descend the Grand Canyon with less than two geologists."

Bill was married and then divorced from his wife Pat (Patricia).

See also
 Tom Bass, The Eudaemonic Pie
 James Gleick, Chaos: Making a New Science

External links
Burke's home page at UCSC
 Photograph of William L. Burke from the UC Santa Cruz Library's Digital Collections
 William L. Burke obituary

1941 births
1996 deaths
20th-century American physicists
Complex systems scientists
University of California, Santa Cruz faculty
University of California, Santa Cruz alumni